Slow journalism is a news subculture borne out of the frustration at the quality of journalism from the mainstream press. A continuation from the larger slow movement, slow journalism shares the same values as other slow-movement subsets in its efforts to produce a good, clean and fair product. Specialist titles have emerged around the world and proclaim to be antidotes to a mainstream media that is "filled to the brim with reprinted press releases, kneejerk punditry, advertorial nonsense and 'churnalism'". Instead, slow journalism tends to focus on long reports and in-depth investigations.

In 2007, academic and former journalist Susan Greenberg gave the name slow journalism to describe storytelling that gives equal value to narrative craft and factual discovery, taking "time to find things out, notice stories that others miss, and communicate it all to the highest standards". This article, published in the UK monthly magazine Prospect on 25 February 2007, was later cited as the original source for the term in the Oxford Dictionary of Journalism.

In 2011, Peter Laufer wrote Slow News: A Manifesto for the Critical News Consumer, published by Oregon State University Press.

In August 2018, Jennifer Rauch, educator and researcher focusing on alternative media, media activism and popular culture, wrote the book Slow Media: Why Slow is Satisfying, Sustainable & Smart, published by Oxford University Press.

In March 2019, Daniele Nalbone, an Italian journalist, and Alberto Puliafito, an Italian journalist, writer, director, and editor in chief of the Italian digital newspaper Slow News, wrote the book Slow Journalism – Chi ha ucciso il giornalismo?, published by Fandango Libri.

In March 2020, Puliafito directed the documentary Slow News, produced by Fulvio Nebbia and internationally distributed by Java Films.

Slow journalism titles 
 24h01, Belgium
 Alternativas Económicas, Spain
De Correspondent, the Netherlands
Delayed Gratification, UK
Jot Down, Spain
ProPublica, USA
Mother Jones (magazine), USA
  The Probe, India
 Slow News, Italy
 Tortoise, UK
  Zetland, Denmark
 Edasi and Levila, Estonia
 Sept.info, Switzerland

See also
Slow living
Slow Media
Slow movement
Slow Reading

References

Journalism